The Miracle of Dammam also known as The Dammam Miracle was the name given to the result of a quarter-final football match between the Nigerian U-20 football team and the USSR U-20 football team at the 1989 FIFA World Youth Championship in Saudi Arabia which the Nigerian U-20 team went on to win on penalties. The match created a footballing record as Nigeria became the first team to come back from four goals down to equalize and then go on to win a FIFA World Cup match at any level.

The match

Summary
The match was played at the Prince Mohamed bin Fahd Stadium in Dammam with an attendance of about 10,000 spectators. The Soviet Union raced to a four-goal lead within 46 minutes with a brace from Sergei Kiriakov in the 30th and 38th minutes with further goals from Bakhva Tedeev and Oleg Salenko in the 45th and 46th minutes respectively in a keenly contested match. With thirty minutes to full-time, Nigeria responded through a brace from Christopher Ohenhen in the 61st and 75th minutes. Samuel Elijah scored the third goal in the 83rd minute before the captain of the Nigerian team Nduka Ugbade completed the remarkable comeback with a goal in the 84th minute to end the game in a draw.

Details

Note
 Nigeria won the match on penalties and went on to become second at the tournament after losing to Portugal in the final.

References

1989 in association football
1988–89 in Saudi Arabian football
1988–89 in Nigerian football
1989 in Soviet football
FIFA World Youth Championship matches
Soviet Union national football team matches
Nigeria national football team matches
FIFA World Youth Championship 1989
Association football penalty shoot-outs
February 1989 sports events in Asia
Nicknamed sporting events